The Mazor Mausoleum is one of the best preserved Roman buildings in Israel, located in El'ad. The Mausoleum, which is the only Roman era building in Israel to still stand from its foundations to its roof, was built for an important Roman man and his wife in the 3rd century AD. Their identities remain a mystery but one can still see the remnants of two sarcophagi in the mausoleum.

Muslim Period

In the Late Antiquity, Muslims added a prayer niche in the southern wall, indicating the direction of Mecca, and the building became an Islamic holy place called Maqam (shrine) en Neby Yahyah (Shrine of the Prophet John). Due to its sacredness, the building was preserved through the ages. It functioned as a mosque until the depopulation of the Palestinian village Al-Muzayri'a in 1948.

In July 1949, Israel decided to raze the mausoleum, after the Israeli army had used the building  for target practice. However an antiquities inspector managed to stop the destruction.

Nowadays 
Currently, Mazor Mausoleum is the National Park under management of Israel’s National Parks Authority.

References

Bibliography

  

Mausoleums in Israel
Buildings and structures completed in the 3rd century
Jews and Judaism in the Roman Empire
Archaeological sites in Israel
Buildings and structures in Central District (Israel)
Islamic holy places
National parks of Israel
Protected areas of Central District (Israel)
Roman archaeology